Cathrine Raben Davidsen (born 1972), is a Danish artist, who lives and works in Copenhagen. Raben Davidsen was born in Copenhagen, Denmark. She received her MFA in 2003 from The Royal Danish Academy of Fine Arts. From 2005 to 2014 Raben Davidsen was represented by Martin Asbæk Gallery.

Education 
Raben Davidsen attended The Royal Danish Academy of Fine Arts, Copenhagen, Denmark from 1996 to 2003, Vrije Academie voor Beeldende Kunsten, Den Haag, The Netherlands from 1995 to 1996, University of Copenhagen, Denmark from 1994 to 1995 and Instituto d´Arte, Lorenzo de Medicii, Firenze, Italy from 1991 to 1992.

Her practice includes drawing, painting, ceramics, printmaking and textile work. Raben Davidsen has collaborated with the Royal Danish Ballet, where she created a scenography for the ballet Virtuosi Steps by August Bournonville. She is currently working on curating an exhibition in collaboration with Royal Copenhagen. She has also collaborated with SHOWstudio and Nick Knight among others.

Selected solo exhibitions 
The Harlequin Set, Martin Asbæk Gallery, Copenhagen, 2013
Trickster, Litografisk, Valby, Denmark, 2013
House of The Ax, GL STRAND, Copenhagen, 2012
The Inkwell, Trapholt Museum of Modern Art, Kolding, Denmark, 2010
Remote Control, Martin Asbæk Gallery, Copenhagen, 2009
White Ink, Horsens Museum of Art, Horsens, Denmark, 2008
Voice of the Shuttle, Schäfer Grafisk Værksted, Copenhagen, 2007
Voice of the Shuttle. Permanent public wall painting at Nimb, Copenhagen, 2007
Meta Morphoses, Sorø Kunstmuseum, Sorø, Denmark, 2006
Penelopes Web, Martin Asbæk Gallery, Copenhagen, 2006
Heroides, Ama Gallery, Turku, Finland, 2005
Pen Pencil Poison, Horsens Museum of Art, Horsens, Denmark, 2003

Selected group exhibitions 
10.000 Hours, Trapholt Museum of Modern Art, Kolding, DK, 2014
The Nordic Influence, curated by Glenn Adamson, MAD, Museum of Art and Design/ represented by Vance Trimble, Collective2/Designfair, New York, 2014
På Kant med Kierkegaard, Holstebro Kunstmuseum, Denmark, 2014
SHOWcabinet: Maison Martin Margiela, SHOWstudio, London, UK, 2013
Zeigen: Karin Sander, Nikolaj Kunsthal, Copenhagen, 2013
På Kant med Kierkegaard, The National Museum of Denmark, 2013
Betroet Tvivl, The Vejen Art Museum, Denmark, 2013
Andratx on Paper, CCA Andratx Kunsthalle for Contemporary Art, Mallorca, Spain, 2013
MARKET Stockholm, represented by Martin Asbæk Gallery, Stockholm, Sweden, 2013
WONDERS – Masterpieces from Private Collections in Denmark, KUNSTEN, Museum of Modern Art Aalborg, Denmark, 2012
A Journey Through A Nordic Fairytale, Pop Up Space, Guided By in Voices, Chelsea, New York City, 2012
Ten years of DANSK, Dansk Design Center, Copenhagen, 2012
Art Moves, GL. STRAND, Copenhagen, 2011
1–4. A Private Collection of Contemporary Art, ACC Showroom, Copenhagen, 2011
Hp & Jo 07, Litografisk, Valby, Denmark, 2007
Groupshow with gallery artists, Martin Asbæk Gallery, Copenhagen, 2007

Awards and fellowships
H.H. Bruuns Honorary Grant; Royal Copenhagen, Niels Wessel Bagge Art Foundation; Grant of Honor, The Danish State Arts Counsel, Danish Arts Foundation, Oda and Hans Svenningsens Foundation, Beckett Foundation Grant, L.F Foghts Foundation Grant, Toyota Foundation Grant, Creative Circle Award: Silver: White Ink, Den Danske Bogdesignpris: Årets Bedste Bogarbejde: White Ink, Stentrykkets Venner, Horsens Kunstmuseums Venners Kunstnerpris

Monographs
Deco Mannequin. Published by Lubok Verlag. Essays by Sanne Kofod Olsen and Barry Schwabsky, 2013
Trickster. Litografisk. Texts by Jacob Thage, Museum Jorn, poems by Josefine Klougart, Amalie Smith, Olga Ravn, 2013
House of The Ax. Copenhagen: GL STRAND. Texts by Helle Behrnt, Sara Hatla, 2012
The Inkwell. Trapholt Museum of Modern Art. Text by Christoffer Emil Bruun. Space Poetry, 2010
White Ink. Horsens: Horsens Museum of Art. Texts by Claus Hagedorn-Olsen, Mads Damsbo, 2008
Voice of the Shuttle. Copenhagen: Schäfer Grafisk Værksted. Poems by Naja Marie Aidt, 2007
Penelopes Web. Copenhagen: Martin Asbæk Gallery. Text by Andrew Smaldone, 2006
Meta Morphoses. Sorø: Sorø Kunstmuseum. Texts by Charlotte Sabroe, Nanna Kronberg Frederiksen, 2006
Pen Pencil Poison, Horsens: Horsens Museum of Art, 2003

References

External links
Official website

Living people
1972 births
Artists from Copenhagen
University of Copenhagen alumni
Royal Danish Academy of Fine Arts alumni